The Frequency Changing Station in East Central, Spokane, Washington is a building listed on the National Register of Historic Places. It was built by the Spokane and Inland Empire Railroad in 1908 to house electrical equipment used by the electric railway. Power was generated at the Nine Mile Falls dam and transmitted to the Frequency Changing Station. The station provided direct current to the streetcar network within the city of Spokane. The substations then converted power back to direct current for the streetcars, but also sold power at 110 volts AC to the communities.

The main station housed four motor-generator sets, four 1250 kilowatt transformers, three 375 kilowatt transformers, and three 75 kilowatt transformers. The east wing of the station contained a 550-volt, 275-cell storage battery.  All of this electrical equipment was removed around 1939, when the owning railroad sold the property.

The railroad connected the cities of Colfax, Washington and Moscow, Idaho to Spokane, and the electric railway figured heavily in the rapid development of the area where it passed.

In the decades since the railroad sold the property, the building has served multiple purposes. By the 1970s it was being used as storage for a boat dealership. At that time, it was renovated and turned into condominium housing. As of 2012, it is still used as housing.

References

Railway buildings and structures on the National Register of Historic Places in Washington (state)
Energy infrastructure completed in 1908
Transport infrastructure completed in 1908
Buildings and structures in Spokane, Washington
Railway buildings and structures on the National Register of Historic Places
National Register of Historic Places in Spokane, Washington
Industrial buildings and structures on the National Register of Historic Places in Washington (state)
1908 establishments in Washington (state)
Great Northern Railway (U.S.)